Fraxinus hondurensis is a species of Fraxinus, endemic to Honduras.

References
 Nelson, C. 1998. Fraxinus hondurensis. 2006 IUCN Red List of Threatened Species.  Downloaded on 21 August 2007.

hondurensis
Endemic flora of Honduras
Trees of Honduras
Critically endangered flora of North America
Taxonomy articles created by Polbot
Flora of the Central American pine–oak forests